Zapotillo is a town in the Loja province of Ecuador and the capital of Zapotillo Canton.

References

Populated places in Loja Province